Sarosa pseudohelotes is a moth in the subfamily Arctiinae. It was described by Rothschild in 1931. It is found in Venezuela.

Subspecies
Sarosa pseudohelotes pseudohelotes
Sarosa pseudohelotes intensior Rothschild, 1931 (Venezuela)

References

Natural History Museum Lepidoptera generic names catalog

Moths described in 1931
Arctiinae